The Embassy of Ukraine in London is the diplomatic mission of Ukraine in the United Kingdom. Ukraine also maintains a consulate at 78 Kensington Park Road, Notting Hill.

History 
The first diplomatic mission of the Ukrainian People's Republic to the United Kingdom was established in May 1919 at 38 Kensington Mansions, Trebovir Road, London SW5, moving to 75 Cornwall Gardens, London SW7 in October 1919.

The Ukrainian mission was not officially recognised by the United Kingdom and its main objective was to secure recognition for the Ukrainian People's Republic. The United Kingdom recognised the independence of Ukraine on 31 December 1991. Diplomatic relations were established on 10 January 1992 and the embassy of Ukraine in the UK was opened in October 1992. The first ambassador of Ukraine to the UK was Serhiy Komisarenko.

List of ambassadors of Ukraine to the United Kingdom

The heads of the diplomatic mission of UNR 
 1919 — Mykola Stakhovsky
 1919 — 1921 — Arnold Margolin 
 1921 — 1923 — Jaroslav Olesnitsky
 1923 — 1924 — Roman Smal-Stocki

Ambassadors 
 1992 — 1997 — Serhiy Komisarenko
 1997 — 2002 — Volodymyr Vasylenko
 2002 — 2005 — Ihor Mityukov
 2005 — 2010 — Ihor Kharchenko
 2010 — 2014 — Volodymyr Khandohiy
 2014 — Andrii Kuzmenko — Chargé d'Affaires a.i.
 2014 — 2015 — Ihor Kyzym — Chargé d'Affaires a.i.
 2015 — 2020 — Natalia Galibarenko
 2020 — present — Vadym Prystaiko

Gallery

See also
 Ukraine–United Kingdom relations 
 Foreign relations of United Kingdom
 Embassy of the United Kingdom, Kyiv
 Diplomatic missions of Ukraine

References

Bibliography 
 Margolin, A. D., From a Political Diary: Russia, the Ukraine, and America, 1905-1945 (New York, 1946)
 Ukrainian Problems. A Collection of Notes and Memoirs Etc. Presented by The Ukrainian Special Diplomatic Mission in London to the British Foreign Office, Ministers and other Persons and Institutions (London, 1919)

External links 
 Official site 
 Ukrainians in the United Kingdom. Online encyclopaedia

Ukraine–United Kingdom relations
Ukraine
London
Buildings and structures in the Royal Borough of Kensington and Chelsea
Holland Park